Louis Rigolly (1876 - 1958), a Frenchman, was the first man to drive a car at over .  

The record stood for just three months. Rigolly also participated in early Grand Prix motor racing, winning the Light car class of the inaugural Circuit des Ardennes in 1902, driving a Gobron-Brillié.

See also
Land speed record

References

Land speed record people
1876 births
1958 deaths